Vladimír Svačina (born 28 April 1987 in Studénka) is a Czech professional ice hockey player. He played with HC Plzeň in the Czech Extraliga during the 2010–11 Czech Extraliga season.

References

External links

1987 births
Living people
Czech ice hockey forwards
HC Plzeň players
People from Studénka
Mississauga IceDogs players
HC Vítkovice players
HC Oceláři Třinec players
Sportspeople from the Moravian-Silesian Region
BK Mladá Boleslav players
HC Frýdek-Místek players
HC Kometa Brno players
HC Dynamo Pardubice players
HC Bílí Tygři Liberec players
HK Poprad players
Czech expatriate ice hockey players in Canada
Czech expatriate ice hockey players in Slovakia